Slax is a LiveCD Linux distribution developed by Tomáš Matějíček and based on upstream customizable Linux distributions. Packages can be added by apt package manager or can be prepared as modules. The tagline for Slax refers to itself as "your pocket operating system".

Features 
One of the main benefits of the Slax distribution is its ease of customization. Additional software can be added and removed, using Slax modules. A traditional package manager such as Debian's APT is not required to load additional software; Slax modules are completely self-contained. However, APT is fully supported. Users can also modify the default CD image or USB drive installation to customize the packages available in the distribution on boot. Slax also allows Debian packages to be converted into Slax modules. 

Slax modules are compressed read-only SquashFS file system images that are compressed with a LZMA compressor. The various modules are stacked together to build the complete Slax root directory. A supplemental writable layer (a tmpfs file system) is put on the top of the stack to implement the write functionality.

Versions

Slackware-Live! 1
Slackware-Live! 1.8.0.1 was based on Slackware 8.0. Slackware-Live! 1.81.0.21 was based on Slackware 8.1.

Slackware-Live! 2
Slackware-Live! 2.9.0.1 was based on Slackware 9.0.

Slax 3
Slackware-Live! was renamed to SLAX in 3.0.24.

Slax 4
Slax 4.0.1 is based on 4.0.1 linux live scripts with Linux Kernel 2.4.25.
Slax 4.2.0 special is based on SLAX 4.2.0.

Slax 5
There were five editions of Slax 5:
 Slax Standard was the standard edition for normal personal use, introduced in Slax 5.0.0.
 Slax KillBill included Wine, DOSBox and QEMU to run DOS and Microsoft Windows applications, introduced with Slax 5.0.2.
 Slax Server supplied additional Internet functionality and came with pre-configured DNS, DHCP, Samba, HTTP, FTP, MySQL, SMTP, POP3, IMAP and SSH servers and several other server applications, introduced with Slax 5.0.8.
 Slax Popcorn was a minimalistic edition focused on browsing and multimedia playback, introduced with Slax 5.0.5. It featured Mozilla Firefox as the default web browser and the lightweight Xfce as a desktop environment instead of KDE.
 Slax Frodo was a "bare bones" edition, providing only a full-featured text-only environment, particularly focused on computers with small amounts of RAM.

The Fluxbox Window Manager was an option in all editions except Frodo.

Slax 5.0.0 standard edition is based on Slackware-current and Linux Live 5 with UnionFS and SquashFS, Linux kernel 2.6.11.6.

Slax 6
Slax 6 is offered in a single version and completely relies on modules (additional packages) for extra features. From version 6, modules are based on LZMA compression, but some compatibility was initially provided between the obsolete .mo modules used by Slax version 5 and the more recent  modules of version 6. As there have been some changes between Linux kernel versions during sub-version releases of Slax 6, however, the .mo modules of Slax 5 are now considered obsolete. Each module or package should be compiled for compatibility with the Linux kernel currently in use.

Slax 7
Slax version 7 was announced on the developer's blog (which has now been integrated into a newly refreshed Slax website). Slax 7 supports both 64-bit and 32-bit architectures, and according to its download page, "is available in more than 50 languages". It also features a stripped-down version of KDE 4, a new wallpaper, and a new module system.

Slax 9
In November 2017, the developer announced the release of version 9. This latest edition is heavily rewritten and is based on Debian, and relies on APT to add packages. The default builds (both 32-bit and 64-bit) contain Fluxbox window manager with a terminal, Chromium web browser, LeafPad text editor, calculator,  file manager, and  network manager.

Slax 11
Slax 11.2 is based on Debian Bullseye (version 11.2).. Slax 11.3 is based on Debian version 11.3.0. Slax 11.4 is based on Debian version 11.4.0. Slax 11.6 is based on Debian version 11.6.0.

Slax 15
Slax 15.0 is based on Slackware 15.

See also 
 Lightweight Linux distribution
 List of Linux distributions that run from RAM

References

External links 

 Official website
 Slax developer's blog
 
 Slax in OpenSourceFeed gallery
 Customizing Slax Configurations
 Reviews:
 Everyday Linux User Review of SLAX

Debian-based distributions
Light-weight Linux distributions
Linux distributions
Live CD
Live USB
LiveDistro
Operating system distributions bootable from read-only media
Slackware